The World Group was the highest level of Fed Cup competition in 2014. The Czech Republic beat Germany in the final to win a third Fed Cup title in four years.

Draw

First round

United States vs. Italy

Spain vs. Czech Republic

Slovakia vs. Germany

Australia vs. Russia

Semifinals

Czech Republic vs. Italy

Germany vs. Australia

Final

Czech Republic vs. Germany

References 

World Group